William III (or in Occitan: Guilhem III) was the Lord of Montpellier from 1025 until his death in 1058. He was the son of William II and husband of Beliardis. His son and successor was William IV. He is the last of the "shadowy" lords of Montpellier, none of whose charters are conserved in the family cartulary, the Liber instrumentorum memorialium.

Notes

Lords of Montpellier
Guilhem dynasty
1058 deaths
Year of birth unknown